SiriusDecisions Summit is an annual sales and marketing conference and seminar hosted by global B2B research and advisory firm SiriusDecisions since 2006 that brings together marketing, sales and product professionals and executives to discuss how alignment between their disciplines can solve business problems and help organizations grow. The company also hosts a Summit Europe.

The Summit 2014 keynote speaker was author Malcolm Gladwell. Former United States Army General Stanley A. McChrystal delivered the Summit 2013 keynote address and SAP CMO Jonathan Becher gave the Summit 2012 keynote address.

Previous host cities of the SiriusDecisions Summit include Orlando (2014), San Diego (2013) and Scottsdale (2012).

During the Summit, SiriusDecisions honors B2B organizations that develop innovative sales and marketing integration practices with its Return on Integration (ROI) Awards. Previous winners include F5 Networks, Iron Mountain and Kronos Incorporated in 2011; Adobe Systems, Citrix, Concur, SAP and Symantec in 2012; and CDW, Dell, LinkedIn, Pegasystems and Siemens Digital Industries Software in 2013.

References

External links
Charno4 B2B Marketplace

Business-to-business